USS YF-448 was an American YF-257-class covered lighter built in 1943 for service in World War II. She was later acquired by the United States Coast Guard and renamed USCGC White Pine (WAGL-547).

Design 
In 1965, she had her original diesel engine built by Union Diesel Engine Company, Oakland, California, with two propellers, 300 horsepower each, and two auxiliary diesel generators.

White Pine underwent a major renovation at Curtis Bay in Baltimore, Maryland. These modifications included updated equipment to improve her AtoN capabilities. She had a lifting capacity of 20,000 pounds, using two hydraulic pumps. She had twin Caterpillar diesel engines, 375 horsepower each, twin propellers, and Detroit Diesel auxiliary generators. Cruising capacity was 10 knots. Her maximum time out to sea was twenty days at 8 knots. Her complement of officers and crew was 26.White Pine was unique in her class for having "spuds," which are retractable stanchions that enabled her to service aids in areas other tenders would find difficult or hazardous. Spuds are vertical poles along the ship's side that are dropped down to the mud bottom to hold the vessel stationary in waters with strong current or where anchors cannot take hold. The spuds are retracted when the buoy work is complete.

 Construction and career YF-448 was laid down by the Erie Concrete & Steel Supply Co., in Erie, Pennsylvania on 12 June 1943. She was launched on 28 August 1943. Her trials were held on Lake Erie on 26 April 1944, and she was placed in service on 20 May 1944. YF-448 was delivered to the supply officer at the Brooklyn Navy Yard, New York, on 20 June 1944, and commissioned on 11 July 1944, with a single mast and boom hoist. Assigned to the Fifth Naval District, YF-448 served in the Maintenance Division.

After World War II, the U.S. Coast Guard acquired YF-448 in 1946 and was commissioned into the Coast Guard as White Pine (WAGL-547) on 3 August 1948. She was the last in her class to receive a commission. Before commissioning, White Pine was outfitted with a barge pusher on the bow to adapt her for working aids to navigation on the western rivers.White Pine began her Coast Guard career in Memphis, Tennessee, where she replaced the Coast Guard cutter Wakerobin. In addition to servicing aids to navigation, she patrolled the Mississippi River for the Marathon Race in 1960. In 1961, she assisted with flood relief at Olive Branch, Tennessee. In late 1961, she was transferred to Curtis Bay, Baltimore, Maryland, where her barge structure was removed to accommodate servicing aids in the Chesapeake Bay. Her hoist was also replaced with an A-frame arrangement and hydraulic power. In 1965, White Pine assisted with firefighting on the Columbian M/V Ciudad de Nieva near Baltimore, Maryland.

In 1975, White Pine and White Holly were authorized to be quipped with air conditioning and AC electrical systems. 1976, White Pine was sent to Mobile, Alabama, to replace the Coast Guard cutter Blackthorn, which was being transferred to Galveston, Texas. After first inspection on 23 August 1976, the Chief of Staff noted, "Welcome to the 8th CG District. The maintenance of the ship and the appearance of the crew is such that the C.O. and the crew can be proud. Your arrival here has set the standard for other ships to strive for. I wish the White Pine much success in the A/N efforts in which she will be engaged."White Pine's area of operation was primarily the Gulf Coast between Gulfport, Mississippi, and St. Marks, Florida, where she serviced 200 lighted and unlighted buoys. She also participated in search and rescue, salvage work, survey work, and marine law enforcement. In December 1984, White Pine rescued four persons from a sunken private craft in the Gulf of Mexico.

White Pine was decommissioned on 29 June 1999, and sold to the Dominican Republic, which commissioned her as BA-1 Tortuguero. She was equipped with two 0.50 cal machine guns for self-defense.

On 15 June 2013, Tortuguero, Orión and Almirante Didiez Burgos departed Santo Domingo for a training exercise.

Awards
American Campaign Medal 
World War II Victory Medal
National Defense Service Medal

ReferencesThis article contains public domain text from the United States Coats Guard Historian’s Office website.''
http://www.uscg.mil/history/WEBCUTTERS/NPS_133_HAER_Report.pdf
Cutter History File. USCG Historian's Office, USCG HQ, Washington, D.C.
Robert Scheina. U.S. Coast Guard Cutters & Craft, 1946–1990. Annapolis, MD: Naval Institute Press, 1990.
U.S. Department of the Interior. National Park Service. U.S. Coast Guard  Buoy Tenders. HAER booklet. Washington, DC: National Park Service, February, 2004. [HAER no. DC-57; Todd Croteau, HAER Industrial Archeologist (project leader); Jet Lowe, HAER Photographer; Mark Porter, NCSHPO Consultant (historian), and Candace Clifford, booklet design.]

External links
NavSource Online: White Pine (WLM-547)
United States Coast Guard: White Pine, 1948
TogetherWeServed: White Pine Crew Members

1943 ships
Historic American Engineering Record in Alabama
Ships built in Erie, Pennsylvania
Ships transferred from the United States Navy to the United States Coast Guard
Ships transferred from the United States Coast Guard to the Dominican Navy
White-class coastal buoy tenders
World War II auxiliary ships of the United States